Dhana Kumari Bajracharya is a former Nepalese Kumari. Kumaris are pre-pubescent girls worshipped in Asian religious traditions as manifestations of female divine energy. Bajracharya was chosen as the official Kumari of the city of Patan, and was supposed to leave her position when her first period happened, but because her menstruation did not start, she reigned as Kumari for three decades until she was replaced against her will in 1984 by instructions of crown prince Dipendra. She chose to continue living as a Kumari, staying in seclusion and never walking in public until the April 2015 Nepal earthquake, where she had to go out of her house on foot for the first time.  Her niece Chanira Bajracharya served as the Kumari of Patan from 2001 to 2010.

References

Living people
Deified women
Hinduism in Nepal
Buddhism in Nepal
Virgin goddesses
Kumaris (goddesses)
Year of birth missing (living people)